Otter Village is an unincorporated community in Center Township, Ripley County, in the U.S. state of Indiana.

History
Otter Village was laid out in 1837. The community took its name from Otter Creek. A post office was established at Otter Village in 1838, and remained in operation until it was discontinued in 1858.

Geography

References

Unincorporated communities in Ripley County, Indiana
Unincorporated communities in Indiana